Charisma House is a Christian publishing firm based in Lake Mary, Florida.  The CEO is Steve Strang. 

Charisma House has published books, including fourteen New York Times best sellers: The Faith of George W. Bush by Stephen Mansfield, Shadowmancer by G. P. Taylor, Wormwood by G. P. Taylor, The Maker’s Diet by Jordan Rubin, The Threshing Floor by Juanita Bynum, The Seven Pillars of Health by Don Colbert,  The Final Move Beyond Iraq by Mike Evans, 

23 Minutes in Hell by Bill Wiese, Fasting by Jentezen Franklin, Dr. Colbert’s “I Can Do This” Diet by Don Colbert, The Harbinger by Jonathan Cahn, (Note: Over 120 weeks on the New York Times, Publishers Weekly bestseller, and USA Today’s Top 150 books) The Mystery of the Shemitah by Jonathan Cahn, The Book of Mysteries by Jonathan Cahn, and The Paradigm by Jonathan Cahn.

Noted Authors 
Florida House of Representatives Representative Kimberly Daniels has published numerous books with Charisma House

References

Book publishing companies based in Florida
Christian mass media companies
Evangelical Christian publishing companies